WOSS (91.1 FM) was a radio station broadcasting a variety format. Licensed to Ossining, New York, United States, the station was last owned by the Ossining Union Free School District. Its license was cancelled on June 2, 2022, due to failing to file a license renewal application.

References

External links

OSS
Radio stations established in 1972
1972 establishments in New York (state)
Radio stations disestablished in 2022
2022 disestablishments in New York (state)
Defunct radio stations in the United States
OSS
High school radio stations in the United States